Semeykin is a crater in the Ismenius Lacus quadrangle on Mars. It is located at 41.8° north latitude and 351.4° west longitude. The crater measures approximately 74 kilometers in diameter and was named after , a Soviet astronomer (1900–1938).

To the northeast of Semeykin are the Mamers Valles.

See also 
 Impact event
 Ismenius Lacus quadrangle
 List of craters on Mars
 Ore resources on Mars
 Planetary nomenclature

References 

 Balyshev M. Historical and biographical research of life and scientific activity of Boris Semeykin (1900-1938). Kinematics and Physics of Celestial Bodies. 2018. Vol. 34 (2). P. 98–101.
 Балышев М.А. Sic itur ad astra: научная биография и трагическая судьба астронома Бориса Евгеньевича Семейкина (1900–1938). Историко-астрономические исследования / Институт истории естествознания и техники им. С. И. Вавилова РАН. Т. ХL. Дубна: Феникс+, 2018. С. 127–169.

Impact craters on Mars
Ismenius Lacus quadrangle